The 1987 NSL Cup (known as the 1987 Beach Fashions Cup for sponsorship reasons) was the eleventh season of the NSL Cup, which was the main national association football knockout cup competition in Australia. All 13 NSL teams from around Australia entered the competition. Sydney City originally were drawn to play away against Marconi Fairfield in the first round, however withdrew from the National Soccer League prior to their match.

Bracket

Round of 16

Quarter-finals

Semi-finals

Final

References

NSL Cup
Cup
NSL Cup seasons